G. "Red Eagle" Smith was a Canadian catcher in the Negro leagues in the 1920s.

A native of Canada, Smith made his Negro leagues debut in 1920 with the Bacharach Giants. He went on to play for the Richmond Giants in 1922.

References

External links
 and Seamheads

Year of birth missing
Year of death missing
Place of birth missing
Place of death missing
Bacharach Giants players
Richmond Giants players
Baseball catchers